The Danish Union of Slaughterhouse Workers (DSA) was a trade union representing workers in the meat industry in Denmark.

The union was founded in 1895, and soon affiliated to the Danish Confederation of Trade Unions.  By 1979, it had 22,902 members.  The following year, it merger with the Danish Tobacco Workers' Union, the Bakery, Pastry and Mill Workers' Union, and the Confectionery and Chocolate Workers' Union, to form the Danish Food and Allied Workers' Union.

References

Food processing trade unions
Trade unions in Denmark
Trade unions established in 1895
Trade unions disestablished in 1980